1968 Coppa delle Alpi shows the results of the 1968 tournament that was held mainly in Switzerland in the preseason 1968/69. The Coppa delle Alpi (translated as Cup of the Alps) was a football tournament, jointly organized by the Italian national league and the Swiss League as a pre-season event. 

Most of the games in the 1968 competition were played in Switzerland. There were four teams taking part from Italy
A.S. Roma, ACF Fiorentina, Cagliari and Juventus, four from Germany 1. FC Kaiserslautern, 1. FC Köln, Eintracht Frankfurt and FC Schalke 04 as well as four from Switzerland Luzern, Servette FC Genève, Young Boys and FC Basel. The teams were drawn into two groups, two teams from each country in either group. The winners of the two groups were matched in the final.

Group A

Matches 
Round 1

Round 2

Round 3

Round 4

Round 5

Table

Group B

Matches 
Round 1

Round 2

Round 3

Round 4

Round 5

Table

Final

Sources and References 
 Cup of the Alps 1968 at RSSSF
 Coppa delle Alpi 1968 at myjuve.it 

Cup of the Alps
Alps